Samuel Merritt Stephenson (December 23, 1831 – July 31, 1907) was a politician from the U.S. state of Michigan.

Personal life
Stephenson was born in Hartland, New Brunswick, and moved with his parents to Maine, and later, in 1846, to Delta County, Michigan.  He engaged in lumbering and moved to Menominee, Michigan, in 1858.  He was interested in real estate, lumbering, general merchandising, and agricultural pursuits. He built the Menominee Hotel in 1881 to accommodate visiting lumber buyers; the structure burned down in 1977. After leaving Congress, Stephenson resumed the lumber business.  He died in Menominee and is interred there at Riverside Cemetery.

His older brother Isaac Stephenson was a U.S. Representative (9th district) 1883-89 and U.S. Senator Class 3 1907-15 from the state of Wisconsin.

Political career
Stephenson served as a member of the Michigan House of Representatives in 1877 and 1878.  He also served in the Michigan Senate in 1879, 1880, 1885, and 1886.  He was a delegate to the Republican National Conventions in 1884 and 1888.

In 1888, Stephenson was elected as a Republican from Michigan's 11th congressional district to the 51st United States Congress and was re-elected in 1890 to the 52nd Congress. After redistricting due to the 1890 census, Stephenson was elected from the newly created 12th district in 1892 and 1894. In all, he served from March 4, 1889, to March 3, 1897, in the U.S. House.

He served as chairman of the board of supervisors of Menominee County for several years.

References

The Political Graveyard

1831 births
1907 deaths
Pre-Confederation Canadian emigrants to the United States
People from Carleton County, New Brunswick
Republican Party Michigan state senators
Republican Party members of the Michigan House of Representatives
People from Menominee, Michigan
Republican Party members of the United States House of Representatives from Michigan
19th-century American politicians